The Women's 100 Butterfly swimming event at the 2009 SEA Games was held on December 12, 2009, in Vientiane, Laos.

Results

Final

Preliminary heats

References

Swimming at the 2009 Southeast Asian Games
2009 in women's swimming